Mohamed Choukri (Arabic: محمد شكري, Berber: ⵎⵓⵃⴰⵎⵎⴻⴷ ⵛⵓⴽⵔⵉ) (15 July 193515November 2003, was a Moroccan author and novelist who is best known for his internationally acclaimed autobiography For Bread Alone (al-Khubz al-Hafi), which was described by the American playwright Tennessee Williams as "A true document of human desperation, shattering in its impact".

Choukri was born in 1935 in Ayt Chiker (Ayt Chiker, hence his adopted family name: Choukri / Chikri), a small village in the Rif mountains in the Nador province, Morocco. He was raised in a very poor family. He ran away from his tyrannical father and became a homeless child living in the poor neighbourhoods of Tangier, surrounded by misery, prostitution, violence and drug abuse. At the age of 20, he decided to learn how to read and write and became later a schoolteacher. His family name Choukri is connected to the name Ayt Chiker which is the Berber tribe cluster he belonged to before fleeing hunger to Tangier. It is most likely that he adopted this name later in Tangier because in the rural Rif family names were rarely registered.

In the 1960s, in the cosmopolitan Tangier, he met Paul Bowles, Jean Genet and Tennessee Williams. Choukri's first writing was published in Al Adab (monthly review of Beirut) in 1966, a story entitled "Al-Unf ala al-shati" ("Violence on the Beach"). International success came with the English translation of Al-khoubz Al-Hafi (For Bread Alone, Telegram Books) by Paul Bowles in 1973. The book was translated to French by Tahar Ben Jelloun in 1980 (Éditions Maspero), published in Arabic in 1982 and censored in Morocco from 1983 to 2000. The book later was translated into 30 languages.

His main works are his autobiographic trilogy, beginning with For Bread Alone, followed by Zaman Al-Akhtaâ aw Al-Shouttar (Time of Mistakes or Streetwise, Telegram Books) and finally Faces. He also wrote collections of short stories in the 1960s/1970s (Majnoun Al-Ward, The Flower Freak, 1980; Al-Khaima, The Tent, 1985). Likewise, he is known for his accounts of his encounters with the writers Paul Bowles, Jean Genet and Tennessee Williams (Jean Genet and Tennessee Williams in Tangier, 1992, Jean Genet in Tangier, 1993, Jean Genet, Suite and End, 1996, Paul Bowles: Le Reclus de Tanger, 1997). See also In Tangier, Telegram Books, 2008, for all three in one volume.

Mohamed Choukri died of cancer on 15 November 2003 at the military hospital of Rabat. He was buried on 17 November at the Marshan cemetery in Tangier, with the audience of the minister of culture, numerous government officials, personalities and the spokesman of the king of Morocco. Before he died, Choukri created a foundation, Mohamed Choukri (president, Mohamed Achaâri), owning his copyrights, his manuscripts and personal writings. Before his death, he provided for his servant of almost 22 years.

Early years
Mohamed Choukri was born to a poor family in Had, Bni Chiker in the Rif region of Morocco, during a famine. He was one of many children and dealt with an abusive, violent father. His mother tongue was Riffian, a dialect of the Amazigh language. Fleeing poverty, his family migrated to the city of Tétouan and then to Tangier. Through his adolescent years, Choukri worked many jobs to survive, including serving a french Family in the Rif of French Algeria, and guiding sailors who arrived in Tangier, managing to learn Spanish that way. He found himself in the company of prostitutes, thieves and smugglers. The situation at home didn't improve however, his father was a cruel despot, and Choukri accused him of murdering his wife and his younger brother Kader. After a family dispute, he left them at 11 years old, living on the streets of Tangier, pilfering to survive, and occasionally resorting to smuggling and prostitution. At the age of 20, he'd met someone willing to teach him to read and write.

Learning how to read and write
He met someone willing to help him learn to read and write in Standard Arabic, a strange language for him and to many who weren't formally educated, because what was spoken day to day was Moroccan vernacular Arabic or Darija, a dialect heavily influenced by the Amazigh language. In 1956 (Year of Morocco's independence) he left for Larache, enrolling in a primary school at the age of 21. At some point he became a schoolteacher through the Ecole Normale. Returning to Tangier in the 1960s, he continued to frequent bars and brothels, and began to write his story in Arabic, forthrightly and showing no reserve when detailing sexual experiences, which was utterly at odds with the mores of Morocco and the Arab world at the time, being met with harsh censure from religious and conservative forces in Morocco and elsewhere.

Despite the criticism, Choukri's daring and exceedingly frank style won him literary fame. His association with the Writer and composer Paul Bowles an American expat who lived in Tangier for decades. Bowles and Choukri worked on the translation of his Choukri's semi-autobiographical work For Bread Alone in 1973, and Bowles arranged for the novel to be published in the United Kingdom through Peter Owen.

Censorship of For Bread Alone
For Bread Alone became an international success when published in English, but the book also caused a furor in the Arab world. When the Arabic edition emerged, it was prohibited in Morocco, on the authority of the Interior Minister, Driss Basri, following the advice of the religious authorities. It was said to have offended by its references to teenage sexual experiences and drug abuse. This censorship ended in 2000, and For Bread Alone was finally published in Morocco. In 1999, For Bread Alone was removed from the syllabus of a modern Arabic Literature course at the American University in Cairo taught by Dr. Samia Mehrez due to some sexually explicit passages, prompting some observers to criticize the "ban" and blame government censorship. The incident was preceded by the removal by order of Hosni Mubarak, president of Egypt, of Maxime Rodinson's book Muhammad. While some blamed "intimidation from Islamist militants, which the government does little to prevent," in fact, the Egyptian government engaged in book banning in that period on a wide scale. Dr. Mehrez was threatened with sexual harassment proceedings and expulsion, the book For Bread Alone was examined by parliament, and the academic and literary community largely supported her use of the novel through a letter-writing campaign.

Later life
Mohamed Choukri believed he had secured that which was most important to him: a posthumous home for his literary work.

His last will and testament, in which he left his entire estate to a foundation that was to be run jointly by five presidents: "After Choukri's death, this document disappeared without a trace," says Roberto de Hollanda, who was the author's literary agent for many years.

Securing his literary legacy was of the utmost importance to Choukri, but the promises that were made to him were not kept: "The decision was whether to give it to a European or an American university or whether to entrust it to a Moroccan institution," the literary agent explains.

Mohamed Choukri chose the Moroccan option. For one thing, he was afraid that the government might stop funding his expensive cancer treatment if he gave away the rights to his work to a foreign entity. On the other hand, it would have been particularly shameful to have given them to one of the countries that had formerly colonized and oppressed Morocco.

Films

For Bread Alone was adapted to cinema by Rachid Benhadj, in an Italian-French-Algerian production in 2004. It starred Said Taghmaoui. The film premiered at the first edition of the Festival of Casablanca in 2005.

Quotations

Works
For Bread Alone, 1973
The Tent, short stories, 1985
Time of Errors, also called "Streetwise" 1992
Jean Genet and Tennessee Williams in Tanger, 1992
Jean Genet in Tanger, 1993
Madman of the Roses, Short stories 1993
Jean Genet, Suite and End, 1996
Paul Bowles, le Reclus de Tanger, 1997
Zoco Chico, 1996
Faces, 1996

See also

 Moroccan literature

References
General
 Mohamed Choukri, 1935-2003, Oussama Zekri, (French)
 "Le pain nu de Mohamed Choukri: une lecture plurielle", par Salah NATIJ, in website Ma'duba / Invitation à l'adab (French)
 Le pain nu de Mohamed Choukri et l'aventure de la traduction, par Salah NATIJ, in website Ma'duba / Invitation à l'adab (French)
 Hassan Daoud, L'homme qui savait ce qu'écrire veut dire,  (French)
 Le poète aux pieds nus, Hanan Kassab-Hassan, (French)
 L'enfant terrible de la littérature arabe et écrivain maudit, Hicham Raji,  (French)
 Mohamed Choukri Biography by Kenneth Lisenbee (English)
 Obituary, Mohamed Choukri, Madman of the roses, November 2003, (English)
Specific

1935 births
2003 deaths
Moroccan writers
Moroccan storytellers
Moroccan male short story writers
Moroccan short story writers
Riffian people
Berber Moroccans
People from Tangier
Deaths from cancer in Morocco
People from Bni Chiker
Berber writers